The 1995 Philadelphia Phillies season was the 113th season in the history of the franchise.

Regular season

The Phillies were in first place for the majority of the first half, thanks to a 37–18 start to the season. However, injuries took their toll, and they went on a 3–16 skid in early July. An eight-game losing streak in August knocked them out of contention.

Season standings

Record vs. opponents

Notable transactions
April 6, 1995: Charlie Hayes signed as a free agent with the Philadelphia Phillies.
 April 14, 1995: Mariano Duncan was signed as a free agent with the Philadelphia Phillies.
April 20, 1995: Gary Varsho signed as a free agent with the Philadelphia Phillies.
 June 1, 1995: Future Heisman Trophy winner Ricky Williams was selected out of high school in the 8th round of the 1995 draft by the Philadelphia Phillies. Williams was the 14th pick of the 8th round and the 213th overall. Williams played shortstop at Patrick Henry HS in San Diego, CA.
June 18, 1995: Andy Van Slyke was traded by the Baltimore Orioles to the Philadelphia Phillies for Gene Harris.
July 7, 1995: Kevin Elster was signed as a free agent with the Philadelphia Phillies.
July 24, 1995: Mark Whiten was traded by the Boston Red Sox to the Philadelphia Phillies for Dave Hollins.
 August 8, 1995: Mariano Duncan was selected off waivers by the Cincinnati Reds from the Philadelphia Phillies.

1995 Game Log

|- style="background:#fbb"
| 1 || April 26 || @ Cardinals || 6–7 || René Arocha (1–0) || Norm Charlton (0–1) || None || 33,539 || 0–1
|- style="background:#bfb"
| 2 || April 27 || @ Cardinals || 6–2 || David West (1–0) || Danny Jackson (0–1) || None || 21,741 || 1–1
|- style="background:#bfb"
| 3 || April 28 || Pirates || 5–2 || Paul Quantrill (1–0) || Denny Neagle (0–1) || Heathcliff Slocumb (1) || 47,088 || 2–1
|- style="background:#fbb"
| 4 || April 29 || Pirates || 2–3 || Esteban Loaiza (1–0) || Tyler Green (0–1) || Jim Gott (1) || 27,530 || 2–2
|- style="background:#bbb"
| – || April 30 || Pirates || colspan=6 | Postponed (rain); Makeup: July 26 as a traditional double-header
|-

|- style="background:#bfb"
| 5 || May 2 || @ Reds || 6–0 || Curt Schilling (1–0) || José Rijo (0–2) || None || 19,389 || 3–2
|- style="background:#fbb"
| 6 || May 3 || @ Reds || 2–7 || Xavier Hernandez (1–0) || Norm Charlton (0–2) || Jeff Brantley (1) || 17,480 || 3–3
|- style="background:#bfb"
| 7 || May 4 || @ Reds || 6–4 || Gene Harris (1–0) || Héctor Carrasco (0–3) || Heathcliff Slocumb (2) || 17,675 || 4–3
|- style="background:#bfb"
| 8 || May 5 || @ Braves || 9–4 || Tyler Green (1–1) || Kent Mercker (0–1) || Toby Borland (1) || 33,296 || 5–3
|- style="background:#bfb"
| 9 || May 6 || @ Braves || 3–1 || Mike Mimbs (1–0) || John Smoltz (1–1) || Heathcliff Slocumb (3) || 37,850 || 6–3
|- style="background:#bfb"
| 10 || May 7 || @ Braves || 5–4 || Curt Schilling (2–0) || Steve Bedrosian (0–1) || Heathcliff Slocumb (4) || 34,166 || 7–3
|- style="background:#bfb"
| 11 || May 8 || @ Braves || 3–2 || Kyle Abbott (1–0) || Tom Glavine (1–1) || Heathcliff Slocumb (5) || 27,266 || 8–3
|- style="background:#bfb"
| 12 || May 9 || Expos || 8–3 || Paul Quantrill (2–0) || Butch Henry (0–2) || None || 21,138 || 9–3
|- style="background:#bfb"
| 13 || May 10 || Expos || 10–1 || Tyler Green (2–1) || Gil Heredia (1–2) || None || 20,708 || 10–3
|- style="background:#fbb"
| 14 || May 11 || Expos || 1–13 || Carlos Pérez (1–0) || Mike Mimbs (1–1) || None || 27,665 || 10–4
|- style="background:#bfb"
| 15 || May 12 || @ Astros || 5–2 || Curt Schilling (3–0) || Doug Drabek (1–2) || Heathcliff Slocumb (6) || 30,828 || 11–4
|- style="background:#bfb"
| 16 || May 13 || @ Astros || 7–5 || Ricky Bottalico (1–0) || Darryl Kile (1–2) || Heathcliff Slocumb (7) || 18,073 || 12–4
|- style="background:#bfb"
| 17 || May 14 || @ Astros || 5–2 || Paul Quantrill (3–0) || Mike Hampton (1–2) || Heathcliff Slocumb (8) || 12,286 || 13–4
|- style="background:#fbb"
| 18 || May 15 || @ Marlins || 1–9 || John Burkett (3–2) || Tyler Green (2–2) || None || 17,897 || 13–5
|- style="background:#bfb"
| 19 || May 16 || @ Marlins || 9–7 (10) || Heathcliff Slocumb (1–0) || Robb Nen (0–2) || None || 19,348 || 14–5
|- style="background:#bfb"
| 20 || May 17 || @ Marlins || 3–1 (13) || Ricky Bottalico (2–0) || Richie Lewis (0–1) || Heathcliff Slocumb (9) || 21,375 || 15–5
|- style="background:#fbb"
| 21 || May 19 || Mets || 1–5 || Eric Gunderson (1–0) || Paul Quantrill (3–1) || None || 31,601 || 15–6
|- style="background:#bfb"
| 22 || May 20 || Mets || 10–8 || Tyler Green (3–2) || Pete Harnisch (0–1) || Heathcliff Slocumb (10) || 38,829 || 16–6
|- style="background:#bfb"
| 23 || May 21 || Mets || 5–3 || Mike Mimbs (2–1) || Bobby J. Jones (3–2) || Heathcliff Slocumb (11) || 43,134 || 17–6
|- style="background:#bfb"
| 24 || May 23 || Giants || 6–5 || Gene Harris (2–0) || Rod Beck (3–2) || None || 22,418 || 18–6
|- style="background:#bfb"
| 25 || May 24 || Giants || 2–1 || Norm Charlton (1–2) || Trevor Wilson (2–2) || Heathcliff Slocumb (12) || 21,131 || 19–6
|- style="background:#fbb"
| 26 || May 25 || Giants || 1–3 (6) || Mark Leiter (2–1) || Tyler Green (3–3) || None || 20,539 || 19–7
|- style="background:#bfb"
| 27 || May 26 || Padres || 2–0 || Mike Mimbs (3–1) || Andy Benes (0–5) || None || 21,032 || 20–7
|- style="background:#bfb"
| 28 || May 27 || Padres || 5–4 (10) || Kyle Abbott (2–0) || Dustin Hermanson (3–1) || None || 33,719 || 21–7
|- style="background:#fbb"
| 29 || May 28 || Padres || 5–13 (10) || Trevor Hoffman (3–0) || Gene Harris (2–1) || None || 33,303 || 21–8
|- style="background:#bfb"
| 30 || May 29 || Dodgers || 8–6 || Paul Quantrill (4–1) || Pedro Astacio (1–2) || Heathcliff Slocumb (13) || 27,426 || 22–8
|- style="background:#bfb"
| 31 || May 30 || Dodgers || 5–0 || Tyler Green (4–3) || Tom Candiotti (2–4) || None || 26,014 || 23–8
|- style="background:#fbb"
| 32 || May 31 || Dodgers || 1–4 (10) || Ramón Martínez (5–3) || Ricky Bottalico (2–1) || Todd Worrell (4) || 22,480 || 23–9
|-

|- style="background:#bfb"
| 33 || June 1 || Cubs || 5–3 || Norm Charlton (2–2) || Steve Trachsel (2–2) || Heathcliff Slocumb (14) || 26,149 || 24–9
|- style="background:#fbb"
| 34 || June 2 || @ Giants || 2–4 || Rod Beck (4–2) || Gene Harris (2–2) || None || 12,484 || 24–10
|- style="background:#fbb"
| 35 || June 3 || @ Giants || 1–3 || Trevor Wilson (3–2) || Paul Quantrill (4–2) || Rod Beck (8) || 16,587 || 24–11
|- style="background:#fbb"
| 36 || June 4 || @ Giants || 0–4 || Mark Leiter (3–1) || Tyler Green (4–4) || None || 22,838 || 24–12
|- style="background:#fbb"
| 37 || June 5 || @ Padres || 4–5 (10) || Trevor Hoffman (4–1) || Norm Charlton (2–3) || None || 7,233 || 24–13
|- style="background:#fbb"
| 38 || June 6 || @ Padres || 0–1 || Fernando Valenzuela (2–2) || Mike Williams (0–1) || Trevor Hoffman (6) || 8,891 || 24–14
|- style="background:#bfb"
| 39 || June 7 || @ Padres || 7–1 || Curt Schilling (4–0) || Andy Ashby (2–4) || None || 9,749 || 25–14
|- style="background:#bfb"
| 40 || June 9 || @ Dodgers || 4–0 || Paul Quantrill (5–2) || Pedro Astacio (1–4) || None || 29,679 || 26–14
|- style="background:#bfb"
| 41 || June 10 || @ Dodgers || 3–0 || Tyler Green (5–4) || Tom Candiotti (2–5) || None || 37,220 || 27–14
|- style="background:#bfb"
| 42 || June 11 || @ Dodgers || 2–1 || Mike Mimbs (4–1) || Ramón Martínez (6–4) || Heathcliff Slocumb (15) || 32,223 || 28–14
|- style="background:#fbb"
| 43 || June 13 || Astros || 5–6 || Dave Veres (3–1) || Curt Schilling (4–1) || John Hudek (7) || 20,311 || 28–15
|- style="background:#fbb"
| 44 || June 14 || Astros || 5–9 || Darryl Kile (2–5) || Norm Charlton (2–4) || Todd Jones (2) || 24,933 || 28–16
|- style="background:#bfb"
| 45 || June 15 || Astros || 4–2 || Ricky Bottalico (3–1) || John Hudek (2–2) || None || 29,411 || 29–16
|- style="background:#fbb"
| 46 || June 16 || Marlins || 1–2 || Pat Rapp (2–3) || David West (1–1) || Robb Nen (4) || 29,092 || 29–17
|- style="background:#bfb"
| 47 || June 17 || Marlins || 11–4 || Mike Mimbs (5–1) || David Weathers (1–3) || None || 37,843 || 30–17
|- style="background:#bfb"
| 48 || June 18 || Marlins || 5–3 || Curt Schilling (5–1) || Yorkis Pérez (0–2) || Heathcliff Slocumb (16) || 40,105 || 31–17
|- style="background:#bfb"
| 49 || June 19 || @ Mets || 6–3 || Paul Quantrill (6–2) || Dave Mlicki (4–3) || Heathcliff Slocumb (17) || 14,250 || 32–17
|- style="background:#bfb"
| 50 || June 20 || @ Mets || 8–2 || Tyler Green (6–4) || Pete Harnisch (1–4) || None || 15,308 || 33–17
|- style="background:#bfb"
| 51 || June 21 || @ Mets || 6–2 || David West (2–1) || Bobby J. Jones (4–4) || Ricky Bottalico (1) || 14,446 || 34–17
|- style="background:#bfb"
| 52 || June 22 || @ Mets || 8–2 || Mike Mimbs (6–1) || Bill Pulsipher (0–2) || None || 15,216 || 35–17
|- style="background:#fbb"
| 53 || June 23 || @ Cardinals || 1–7 || Mike Morgan (3–2) || Curt Schilling (5–2) || None || 29,375 || 35–18
|- style="background:#bfb"
| 54 || June 24 || @ Cardinals || 10–9 || Paul Quantrill (7–2) || Ken Hill (4–4) || Heathcliff Slocumb (18) || 24,013 || 36–18
|- style="background:#bfb"
| 55 || June 25 || @ Cardinals || 5–3 || Tyler Green (7–4) || Tom Urbani (1–3) || Heathcliff Slocumb (19) || 24,304 || 37–18
|- style="background:#fbb"
| 56 || June 27 || Reds || 3–12 || John Smiley (7–1) || Mike Mimbs (6–2) || Xavier Hernandez (3) || 25,020 || 37–19
|- style="background:#fbb"
| 57 || June 28 || Reds || 0–1 || C. J. Nitkowski (1–1) || Curt Schilling (5–3) || Jeff Brantley (12) || 26,579 || 37–20
|- style="background:#fbb"
| 58 || June 29 || Reds || 4–10 || Pete Schourek (6–4) || Paul Quantrill (7–3) || None || 33,614 || 37–21
|- style="background:#bfb"
| 59 || June 30 || Braves || 3–1 || Tyler Green (8–4) || John Smoltz (7–4) || Heathcliff Slocumb (20) || 32,821 || 38–21
|-

|- style="background:#fbb"
| 60 || July 1 || Braves || 1–3 || Greg Maddux (8–1) || David West (2–2) || None || 33,375 || 38–22
|- style="background:#fbb"
| 61 || July 2 || Braves || 3–5 || Tom Glavine (7–4) || Mike Mimbs (6–3) || Mark Wohlers (6) || 35,648 || 38–23
|- style="background:#fbb"
| 62 || July 3 || Braves || 4–10 || Steve Avery (3–5) || Curt Schilling (5–4) || None || 59,203 || 38–24
|- style="background:#fbb"
| 63 || July 4 || @ Pirates || 0–7 || John Ericks (1–1) || Paul Quantrill (7–4) || None || 23,334 || 38–25
|- style="background:#fbb"
| 64 || July 5 || @ Pirates || 4–7 || Dan Plesac (3–0) || Norm Charlton (2–5) || None || 9,245 || 38–26
|- style="background:#bfb"
| 65 || July 6 || @ Pirates || 10–5 || David West (3–2) || Steve Parris (1–2) || None || 10,039 || 39–26
|- style="background:#fbb"
| 66 || July 7 || Cubs || 2–8 || Jim Bullinger (6–1) || Mike Mimbs (6–4) || Bryan Hickerson (1) || 52,516 || 39–27
|- style="background:#fbb"
| 67 || July 8 || Cubs || 1–3 || Jaime Navarro (7–2) || Curt Schilling (5–5) || Randy Myers (21) || 31,892 || 39–28
|- style="background:#fbb"
| 68 || July 9 || Cubs || 6–7 (13) || Turk Wendell (2–0) || Mike Williams (0–2) || None || 34,669 || 39–29
|- style="background:#bbcaff;"
| – || July 11 ||colspan="7" |1995 Major League Baseball All-Star Game at The Ballpark in Arlington in Arlington
|- style="background:#fbb"
| 69 || July 12 || Cardinals || 3–4 || Danny Jackson (2–9) || Mike Mimbs (6–5) || Tom Henke (18) || 24,327 || 39–30
|- style="background:#bfb"
| 70 || July 13 || @ Expos || 4–3 || Curt Schilling (6–5) || Jeff Fassero (8–7) || Heathcliff Slocumb (21) || 16,991 || 40–30
|- style="background:#fbb"
| 71 || July 14 || @ Expos || 2–8 || Pedro Martínez (7–5) || Tyler Green (8–5) || None || 15,921 || 40–31
|- style="background:#fbb"
| 72 || July 15 || @ Expos || 3–5 || Butch Henry (4–7) || Paul Quantrill (7–5) || Mel Rojas (16) || 30,100 || 40–32
|- style="background:#fbb"
| 73 || July 16 || @ Expos || 1–5 || Carlos Pérez (8–2) || Sid Fernandez (0–5) || Mel Rojas (17) || 22,345 || 40–33
|- style="background:#fbb"
| 74 || July 17 || @ Rockies || 5–8 || Mike Munoz (2–2) || Ricky Bottalico (3–2) || Darren Holmes (8) || 48,070 || 40–34
|- style="background:#bfb"
| 75 || July 18 || @ Rockies || 7–5 || Curt Schilling (7–5) || Kevin Ritz (7–5) || Heathcliff Slocumb (22) || 48,011 || 41–34
|- style="background:#fbb"
| 76 || July 19 || @ Rockies || 3–5 || Bryan Rekar (1–0) || Tyler Green (8–6) || Darren Holmes (9) || 48,087 || 41–35
|- style="background:#fbb"
| 77 || July 20 || @ Rockies || 3–7 || Bill Swift (6–2) || Paul Quantrill (7–6) || None || 48,037 || 41–36
|- style="background:#bfb"
| 78 || July 21 || Cardinals || 7–0 || Sid Fernandez (1–5) || Donovan Osborne (0–3) || Toby Borland (2) || 28,468 || 42–36
|- style="background:#fbb"
| 79 || July 22 || Cardinals || 3–5 (11) || Rich DeLucia (5–4) || Omar Olivares (1–4) || Tom Henke (22) || 35,513 || 42–37
|- style="background:#bfb"
| 80 || July 23 || Cardinals || 10–6 || Paul Quantrill (8–6) || Ken Hill (6–7) || Toby Borland (3) || 30,104 || 43–37
|- style="background:#fbb"
| 81 || July 24 || Rockies || 3–11 || Bryan Rekar (2–0) || Tyler Green (8–7) || None || 25,424 || 43–38
|- style="background:#bfb"
| 82 || July 25 || Rockies || 7–6 (10) || Heathcliff Slocumb (2–0) || Mike Munoz (2–3) || None || 25,837 || 44–38
|- style="background:#bfb"
| 83 || July 26 (1) || Pirates || 2–1 (11) || Toby Borland (1–0) || Dan Plesac (3–3) || None || see 2nd game || 45–38
|- style="background:#bfb"
| 84 || July 26 (2) || Pirates || 6–4 || Paul Quantrill (9–6) || Mike Dyer (3–2) || Heathcliff Slocumb (23) || 32,517 || 46–38
|- style="background:#bfb"
| 85 || July 27 || Pirates || 6–4 || Mike Mimbs (7–5) || John Ericks (2–3) || Heathcliff Slocumb (24) || 31,955 || 47–38
|- style="background:#fbb"
| 86 || July 28 || @ Cubs || 0–4 || Frank Castillo (7–5) || Bobby Muñoz (0–1) || Randy Myers (24) || 31,629 || 47–39
|- style="background:#fbb"
| 87 || July 29 || @ Cubs || 7–8 || Anthony Young (1–3) || Heathcliff Slocumb (2–1) || None || 38,768 || 47–40
|- style="background:#fbb"
| 88 || July 30 || @ Cubs || 0–8 || Jim Bullinger (8–2) || Jim Deshaies (0–1) || None || 32,797 || 47–41
|-

|- style="background:#bfb"
| 89 || August 1 || @ Braves || 4–3 || Sid Fernandez (2–5) || Steve Avery (4–7) || Heathcliff Slocumb (25) || 38,579 || 48–41
|- style="background:#fbb"
| 90 || August 2 || @ Braves || 5–7 || Kent Mercker (5–6) || Bobby Muñoz (0–2) || Mark Wohlers (12) || 39,594 || 48–42
|- style="background:#fbb"
| 91 || August 3 || @ Braves || 4–5 || Pedro Borbón (1–1) || Heathcliff Slocumb (2–2) || None || 37,971 || 48–43
|- style="background:#fbb"
| 92 || August 4 || @ Reds || 0–1 || John Smiley (11–1) || Jeff Juden (0–1) || Jeff Brantley (23) || 30,668 || 48–44
|- style="background:#bbb"
| – || August 5 || @ Reds || colspan=6 | Postponed (rain); Makeup: August 6 as a traditional double-header
|- style="background:#fbb"
| 93 || August 6 (1) || @ Reds || 1–6 || Pete Schourek (12–5) || Tommy Greene (0–1) || None || see 2nd game || 48–45
|- style="background:#fbb"
| 94 || August 6 (2) || @ Reds || 1–2 (10) || Mike Jackson (5–0) || Heathcliff Slocumb (2–3) || None || 34,784 || 48–46
|- style="background:#fbb"
| 95 || August 8 || Mets || 10–12 || Reid Cornelius (1–1) || Tyler Green (8–8) || John Franco (14) || 28,536 || 48–47
|- style="background:#fbb"
| 96 || August 9 || Mets || 0–4 || Jason Isringhausen (2–1) || Paul Quantrill (9–7) || None || 36,147 || 48–48
|- style="background:#fbb"
| 97 || August 10 || Mets || 1–5 (11) || Don Florence (1–0) || Heathcliff Slocumb (2–4) || None || 24,795 || 48–49
|- style="background:#bfb"
| 98 || August 11 || Expos || 6–5 || Sid Fernandez (3–5) || Carlos Pérez (10–4) || Heathcliff Slocumb (26) || 25,194 || 49–49
|- style="background:#fbb"
| 99 || August 12 || Expos || 3–4 || Jeff Fassero (11–9) || Tommy Greene (0–2) || Dave Leiper (2) || 37,267 || 49–50
|- style="background:#fbb"
| 100 || August 13 || Expos || 2–3 || Tim Scott (1–0) || Ricky Bottalico (3–3) || Mel Rojas (21) || 31,528 || 49–51
|- style="background:#fbb"
| 101 || August 14 || Expos || 1–5 || Pedro Martínez (11–7) || Paul Quantrill (9–8) || None || 25,835 || 49–52
|- style="background:#bfb"
| 102 || August 15 || @ Astros || 3–2 || Jeff Juden (1–1) || Greg Swindell (7–7) || Heathcliff Slocumb (27) || 13,516 || 50–52
|- style="background:#fbb"
| 103 || August 16 || @ Astros || 4–5 || Dean Hartgraves (1–0) || Heathcliff Slocumb (2–5) || None || 13,000 || 50–53
|- style="background:#bfb"
| 104 || August 17 || @ Astros || 3–2 || Paul Fletcher (1–0) || Todd Jones (6–3) || Toby Borland (4) || 12,587 || 51–53
|- style="background:#bfb"
| 105 || August 18 || Giants || 16–8 || Mike Mimbs (8–5) || Chris Hook (5–1) || None || 23,409 || 52–53
|- style="background:#bfb"
| 106 || August 19 || Giants || 6–4 || Ricky Bottalico (4–3) || Sergio Valdez (1–3) || Heathcliff Slocumb (28) || 25,712 || 53–53
|- style="background:#bfb"
| 107 || August 20 || Giants || 8–7 (10) || Heathcliff Slocumb (3–5) || José Bautista (2–8) || None || 30,176 || 54–53
|- style="background:#bfb"
| 108 || August 21 || Padres || 3–1 || Sid Fernandez (4–5) || Andy Ashby (9–7) || Toby Borland (5) || 22,865 || 55–53
|- style="background:#fbb"
| 109 || August 22 || Padres || 3–5 || Fernando Valenzuela (3–3) || Tommy Greene (0–3) || Trevor Hoffman (25) || 28,325 || 55–54
|- style="background:#bfb"
| 110 || August 23 || Padres || 12–8 || Mike Williams (1–2) || Glenn Dishman (4–6) || Mike Mimbs (1) || 21,017 || 56–54
|- style="background:#bfb"
| 111 || August 24 || Dodgers || 7–6 (11) || Heathcliff Slocumb (4–5) || Rudy Seánez (1–3) || None || 24,448 || 57–54
|- style="background:#bfb"
| 112 || August 25 || Dodgers || 17–4 || Jeff Juden (2–1) || Hideo Nomo (10–5) || None || 33,230 || 58–54
|- style="background:#bfb"
| 113 || August 26 || Dodgers || 9–4 || Sid Fernandez (5–5) || Ismael Valdez (11–8) || None || 30,126 || 59–54
|- style="background:#fbb"
| 114 || August 27 || Dodgers || 1–9 || Kevin Tapani (8–12) || Tommy Greene (0–4) || None || 32,889 || 59–55
|- style="background:#fbb"
| 115 || August 29 || @ Giants || 4–6 || Terry Mulholland (4–10) || Paul Quantrill (9–9) || Rod Beck (25) || 11,304 || 59–56
|- style="background:#fbb"
| 116 || August 30 || @ Giants || 1–4 || William Van Landingham (5–3) || Jeff Juden (2–2) || Rod Beck (26) || 11,635 || 59–57
|- style="background:#bfb"
| 117 || August 31 || @ Giants || 6–0 || Sid Fernandez (6–5) || Jamie Brewington (4–2) || None || 11,265 || 60–57
|-

|- style="background:#fbb"
| 118 || September 1 || @ Padres || 3–6 || Fernando Valenzuela (5–3) || Mike Grace (0–1) || Trevor Hoffman (26) || 18,125 || 60–58
|- style="background:#fbb"
| 119 || September 2 || @ Padres || 5–6 (11) || Trevor Hoffman (6–4) || Heathcliff Slocumb (4–6) || None || 18,401 || 60–59
|- style="background:#bfb"
| 120 || September 3 || @ Padres || 3–2 || Paul Quantrill (10–9) || Joey Hamilton (6–7) || Heathcliff Slocumb (29) || 14,783 || 61–59
|- style="background:#fbb"
| 121 || September 4 || @ Dodgers || 1–5 || Tom Candiotti (7–12) || Jeff Juden (2–3) || None || 44,910 || 61–60
|- style="background:#fbb"
| 122 || September 5 || @ Dodgers || 1–2 || John Cummings (2–1) || Toby Borland (1–1) || None || 39,406 || 61–61
|- style="background:#bfb"
| 123 || September 6 || @ Dodgers || 1–0 || Mike Grace (1–1) || Ismael Valdez (11–10) || Heathcliff Slocumb (30) || 29,835 || 62–61
|- style="background:#fbb"
| 124 || September 8 || Astros || 3–12 || Mike Hampton (9–6) || Tyler Green (8–9) || None || 24,059 || 62–62
|- style="background:#bfb"
| 125 || September 9 || Astros || 6–4 (11) || Heathcliff Slocumb (5–6) || Mike Henneman (0–2) || None || 25,665 || 63–62
|- style="background:#fbb"
| 126 || September 10 || Astros || 4–5 || Doug Drabek (9–8) || Jeff Juden (2–4) || Mike Henneman (22) || 27,235 || 63–63
|- style="background:#bfb"
| 127 || September 12 || @ Expos || 8–2 || Mike Williams (2–2) || Tavo Álvarez (1–3) || Toby Borland (6) || 11,246 || 64–63
|- style="background:#fbb"
| 128 || September 13 || @ Expos || 4–5 || Gil Heredia (5–6) || Dennis Springer (0–1) || Mel Rojas (27) || 11,335 || 64–64
|- style="background:#bfb"
| 129 || September 14 || @ Pirates || 7–2 || Paul Quantrill (11–9) || Paul Wagner (4–15) || None || 7,770 || 65–64
|- style="background:#fbb"
| 130 || September 15 || @ Mets || 1–4 || Jason Isringhausen (7–2) || Mike Mimbs (8–6) || John Franco (24) || 15,637 || 65–65
|- style="background:#fbb"
| 131 || September 16 || @ Mets || 8–10 || Dave Telgheder (1–1) || Tommy Greene (0–5) || John Franco (25) || 18,351 || 65–66
|- style="background:#fbb"
| 132 || September 17 || @ Mets || 2–8 || Reid Cornelius (2–6) || Mike Williams (2–3) || Jerry Dipoto (2) || 16,325 || 65–67
|- style="background:#bfb"
| 133 || September 18 || Marlins || 13–10 || Ricky Bottalico (5–3) || Randy Veres (4–4) || Heathcliff Slocumb (31) || 17,736 || 66–67
|- style="background:#fbb"
| 134 || September 19 || Marlins || 4–5 || Yorkis Pérez (2–6) || Toby Borland (1–2) || Robb Nen (21) || 19,555 || 66–68
|- style="background:#fbb"
| 135 || September 20 || Marlins || 1–2 || John Burkett (14–12) || Paul Quantrill (11–10) || None || 17,885 || 66–69
|- style="background:#bfb"
| 136 || September 21 || Marlins || 3–1 || Mike Mimbs (9–6) || Willie Banks (2–6) || Steve Frey (1) || 18,953 || 67–69
|- style="background:#fbb"
| 137 || September 22 || Reds || 2–3 || Dave Burba (10–3) || Toby Borland (1–3) || Jeff Brantley (26) || 21,183 || 67–70
|- style="background:#bfb"
| 138 || September 23 || Reds || 3–2 (13) || Chuck Ricci (1–0) || Xavier Hernandez (7–2) || None || 23,315 || 68–70
|- style="background:#fbb"
| 139 || September 24 || Reds || 4–6 || David Wells (16–7) || Dennis Springer (0–2) || Jeff Brantley (27) || 30,310 || 68–71
|- style="background:#fbb"
| 140 || September 26 || Braves || 1–5 || John Smoltz (12–7) || Paul Quantrill (11–11) || None || 21,476 || 68–72
|- style="background:#fbb"
| 141 || September 27 || Braves || 0–6 || Greg Maddux (19–2) || Mike Mimbs (9–7) || None || 26,636 || 68–73
|- style="background:#fbb"
| 142 || September 29 || @ Marlins || 2–5 || Chris Hammond (9–6) || Dennis Springer (0–3) || None || 29,331 || 68–74
|- style="background:#bfb"
| 143 || September 30 || @ Marlins || 3–2 || Mike Williams (3–3) || John Burkett (14–14) || Heathcliff Slocumb (32) || 39,183 || 69–74
|-

|- style="background:#fbb"
| 144 || October 1 || @ Marlins || 2–8 || Ryan Bowen (2–0) || Paul Quantrill' (11–12) || None || 30,211 || 69–75
|-

Roster

Player stats

Batting

Starters by positionNote: Pos= Position; G = Games played; AB = At bats; H = Hits; Avg. = Batting average; HR = Home runs; RBI = Runs batted inOther battersNote: G = Games played; AB = At bats; H = Hits; Avg. = Batting average; HR = Home runs; RBI = Runs batted inPitching

Starting pitchersNote: G = Games pitched; IP = Innings pitched; W = Wins; L = Losses; ERA = Earned run average; SO = StrikeoutsOther pitchersNote: G = Games pitched; IP = Innings pitched; W = Wins; L = Losses; ERA = Earned run average; SO = StrikeoutsRelief pitchersNote: G = Games pitched; W = Wins; L = Losses; SV = Saves; ERA = Earned run average; SO = Strikeouts Farm system 

LEAGUE CHAMPIONS: Reading

Notes

References
1995 Philadelphia Phillies season at Baseball Reference''

Philadelphia Phillies seasons
Philadelphia Phillies Season, 1995
Philadelphia Phillies